Victor Masayesva Jr. (born 1951) is a Hopi filmmaker, video-artist, and photographer. Born on the Hopi Reservation of Arizona, and growing up in Hotevilla, Masayesva's artistic career reflects his active participation with the Hopi community, his body of work promoting Hopi culture and worldview. Scholar Martin Padget considers Masayesva "one of the most influential Indigenous filmmakers and photographers of his generation." Masayesva's films and photographs are diverse and complex in nature, often employing diverse visual language, and an experimental approach towards media. The majority of his films are in Hopi language and are destined for his community, especially to pass-on traditional teachings to youth. Masayesva has also been personally involved in promoting indigenous media, both in the United States and internationally.

Education and early career 
As a teenager, Masayesva was recruited to attend the Horace Mann School in New York. He later studied Hopi ceremonies and English at Princeton University. and pursued graduate studies in English and photography at the University of Arizona. Following his studies, Masayesva became the director of Hotevilla's Ethnic Heritage Program, where, in 1980, he created a program to teach Hopi language and values in community schools and trained Hopi high school students in video production.

Notable works 
Hopiit (1982): Created from footage he had shot during the Ethnic Heritage program, Masayesva's first film is a documentary short intended for a Hopi audience, presenting a "montage of different views of Hopi landscapes and people during the cycle of a year."

Itam Hakim, Hopiit (1985): In Masayesva's first feature-length documentary, a tribal elder from the Hopi historian's clan recounts stories of Hopi history and philosophy, which Masayesva interprets through visual imagery. Diverging from documentary tradition, the film uses various camera techniques and changes of perspectives (2). Scholar Sonja Bahn-Coblans writes that in the documentary, "the Eurocentric perception of time and space has distinct difficulty in coping with the 'spherical' and 'cyclical' perceptions of the Native American." Made to commemorate the Hopi Tercentennial 1680-1980, the film received funding from German national television (ZDF). Although initially released in Hopi in the United States, after receiving distribution opportunities, Masayesva created an English version.

With growing interest in his work from cultural outsiders, Masayesva's succeeding films engaged with misconceptions of Hopi culture and were destined for non-indigenous audiences, beginning with Ritual Clowns (1988), which uses computer animation and plays with color to explore Hopi pottery. His next two documentaries were commissioned for museums, and both explore traditions in Native American ceramic-making: Pott Starr (1990), which also incorporates animation, and Siskyavi: The Place of Chasms (1991).

Imagining Indians (1993): Shot on 16mm film with an entirely Native-American crew, this feature-length documentary critiques representations of Native Americans in Hollywood and other forms of media. Masayesva visited indigenous communities in Arizona, Montana, New Mexico, South Dakota, Washington, and the Amazon to produce the film.  It is considered one of Masayesva's "best-known and most critically debated films".

Awards and honors 
Masayesva received one of the first Intercultural Media Fellowships from the Rockefeller Foundation, allowing him to use computer animation and graphics in his films. He has received the University of Arizona Distinguished Alumni Award, the Gold Hugo at the Chicago International Film Festival the Two Rivers Visionary Award, the Taos Festival's distinguished filmmaker award, and the American Film Institute's Maya Deren Award.

His video work has appeared in the Native American Film and Video Festival, the Museum of Modern Art New York, the Long Beach Museum of Art, the World Wide Video Festival, the Whitney Museum of American Art Biennial, Haus der Kulturen der Welt Berlin, the San Francisco Art Institute, and the American Indian Contemporary Arts "Festival 2000".

Filmography

References 

1951 births
Living people
Hopi people
Native American filmmakers
People from Navajo County, Arizona
Native American photographers
Native American male artists
American video artists
Rockefeller Fellows
Native American people from Arizona
21st-century American photographers